NGC 668 is a spiral galaxy located 200 million light-years away in the constellation Andromeda. It was discovered by astronomer Édouard Stephan on December 4, 1880 and is a member of Abell 262.

See also
 List of NGC objects (1–1000)

References

External links

668
01238
006502
Andromeda (constellation)
Astronomical objects discovered in 1880
Spiral galaxies
Abell 262